In Greek mythology, Eurymedon ("ruling far and wide") was the name of several minor figures:

 Eurymedon, in rare accounts, a Titan or Giant who fathered Prometheus after raping Hera.
 Eurymedon, king of the Gigantes, father of Periboea (mother of Nausithous by Poseidon). He brought destruction on his people and was himself destroyed.
 Eurymedon, one of the Cabiri, children of Hephaestus and Cabiro, a Thracian woman. He was the brother of Alcon. Eurymedon fought in the Indian War of Dionysus but he fled when attacked by Orontes.
 Eurymedon, possible father of Cinyras by the nymph Paphia.
 Eurymedon, one of the four sons of Minos and his concubine Pareia. His brothers were Nephalion, Chryses and Philolaus. Eurymedon was a resident of the island of Paros in the Cyclades but was slain by the hero Heracles.
 Eurymedon, son of Dionysus and Ariadne, one of the Argonauts. He was the brother of Phlias.  
 Eurymedon, father of Andromache who was one of the sacrificial victims of the Minotaur.
Eurymedon, father of Leanida who consorted with Zeus and became the mother of Coron.
 Eurymedon, defender of the Hypsistan gate at Thebes during the military campaign of the Seven against Thebes. He is the son of Faunus (Pan).
 Eurymedon, squire and charioteer of Agamemnon. He was the son of Ptolemy (Ptolemaeus), son of Peiraeus. Eurymedon's tomb was shown at Mycenae.
 Eurymedon, servant of Nestor.
 Eurymedon, a surname of Poseidon, Perseus and Hermes.

References

Further reading
Apollonius Rhodius, Argonautica translated by Robert Cooper Seaton (1853-1915), R. C. Loeb Classical Library Volume 001. London, William Heinemann Ltd, 1912. Online version at the Topos Text Project.
Apollonius Rhodius, Argonautica. George W. Mooney. London. Longmans, Green. 1912. Greek text available at the Perseus Digital Library.
Gaius Julius Hyginus, Fabulae from The Myths of Hyginus translated and edited by Mary Grant. University of Kansas Publications in Humanistic Studies. Online version at the Topos Text Project.
Homer, The Iliad with an English Translation by A.T. Murray, Ph.D. in two volumes. Cambridge, MA., Harvard University Press; London, William Heinemann, Ltd. 1924. . Online version at the Perseus Digital Library.
Homer, Homeri Opera in five volumes. Oxford, Oxford University Press. 1920. . Greek text available at the Perseus Digital Library.
Homer, The Odyssey with an English Translation by A.T. Murray, PH.D. in two volumes. Cambridge, MA., Harvard University Press; London, William Heinemann, Ltd. 1919. . Online version at the Perseus Digital Library. Greek text available from the same website.
Kaya, Durmuş, and Stephen Mitchell. “The Sanctuary of the God Eurymedon at Tymbriada in Pisidia.” Anatolian Studies, vol. 35, 1985, pp. 39–55. JSTOR, www.jstor.org/stable/3642870. Accessed 24 Apr. 2020.
Marcus Tullius Cicero, Nature of the Gods from the Treatises of M.T. Cicero translated by Charles Duke Yonge (1812-1891), Bohn edition of 1878. Online version at the Topos Text Project.
Marcus Tullius Cicero, De Natura Deorum. O. Plasberg. Leipzig. Teubner. 1917.  Latin text available at the Perseus Digital Library.
Maurus Servius Honoratus, In Vergilii carmina comentarii. Servii Grammatici qui feruntur in Vergilii carmina commentarii; recensuerunt Georgius Thilo et Hermannus Hagen. Georgius Thilo. Leipzig. B. G. Teubner. 1881. Online version at the Perseus Digital Library.
Nonnus of Panopolis, Dionysiaca translated by William Henry Denham Rouse (1863-1950), from the Loeb Classical Library, Cambridge, MA, Harvard University Press, 1940.  Online version at the Topos Text Project.
Nonnus of Panopolis, Dionysiaca. 3 Vols. W.H.D. Rouse. Cambridge, MA., Harvard University Press; London, William Heinemann, Ltd. 1940-1942. Greek text available at the Perseus Digital Library.
Pausanias, Description of Greece with an English Translation by W.H.S. Jones, Litt.D., and H.A. Ormerod, M.A., in 4 Volumes. Cambridge, MA, Harvard University Press; London, William Heinemann Ltd. 1918. . Online version at the Perseus Digital Library
Pausanias, Graeciae Descriptio. 3 vols. Leipzig, Teubner. 1903.  Greek text available at the Perseus Digital Library.
Pindar, Odes translated by Diane Arnson Svarlien. 1990. Online version at the Perseus Digital Library.
Pindar, The Odes of Pindar including the Principal Fragments with an Introduction and an English Translation by Sir John Sandys, Litt.D., FBA. Cambridge, MA., Harvard University Press; London, William Heinemann Ltd. 1937. Greek text available at the Perseus Digital Library.
Pseudo-Apollodorus, The Library with an English Translation by Sir James George Frazer, F.B.A., F.R.S. in 2 Volumes, Cambridge, MA, Harvard University Press; London, William Heinemann Ltd. 1921. . Online version at the Perseus Digital Library. Greek text available from the same website.
Publius Papinius Statius, The Thebaid translated by John Henry Mozley. Loeb Classical Library Volumes. Cambridge, MA, Harvard University Press; London, William Heinemann Ltd. 1928. Online version at the Topos Text Project.
Publius Papinius Statius, The Thebaid. Vol I-II. John Henry Mozley. London: William Heinemann; New York: G.P. Putnam's Sons. 1928. Latin text available at the Perseus Digital Library.

Jovian deities
Gigantes
Argonauts
Kings in Greek mythology
Achaeans (Homer)
Characters in Seven against Thebes
Greek giants
Theban characters in Greek mythology
Messenian mythology
Mythological rapists